A list of populated places in Amasya Province, Turkey by district:

Amasya

Amasya
Abacı, Amasya
Aksalur, Amasya
Aktaş, Amasya
Akyazı, Amasya
Alakadı, Amasya
Albayrak, Amasya
Ardıçlar, Amasya
Avşar, Amasya
Aydoğdu, Amasya
Aydınlık, Amasya
Ağılönü, Amasya
Bayat, Amasya
Bağlarüstü, Amasya
Bağlıca, Amasya
Beke, Amasya
Beldağı, Amasya
Boğaköy, Amasya
Boğazköy, Amasya
Bulduklu, Amasya
Böke, Amasya
Dadıköy, Amasya
Damudere, Amasya
Değirmendere, Amasya
Direkli, Amasya
Doğantepe, Amasya
Duruca, Amasya
Eliktekke, Amasya
Eskikızılca, Amasya
Fındıklı, Amasya
Gökdere, Amasya
Gözlek, Amasya
Halifeli, Amasya
Hasabdal, Amasya
Kaleboğazı, Amasya
Kaleköy, Amasya
Kapıkaya, Amasya
Karaali, Amasya
Karaibrahim, Amasya
Karakese, Amasya
Karaköprü, Amasya
Karaçavuş, Amasya
Karsan, Amasya
Kayabaşı, Amasya
Kayacık, Amasya
Keçili, Amasya
Keşlik, Amasya
Kutlu, Amasya
Kuzgeçe, Amasya
Köyceğiz, Amasya
Küçükkızılca, Amasya
Kızseki, Amasya
Kızılca, Amasya
Kızılkışlacık, Amasya
Mahmatlar, Amasya
Meşeliçiftliğiköyü, Amasya
Musaköy, Amasya
Ormanözü, Amasya
Ortaköy, Amasya
Ovasaray, Amasya
Saraycık, Amasya
Sarayözü, Amasya
Sarıalan, Amasya
Sarıkız, Amasya
Sarılar, Amasya
Sarımeşe, Amasya
Sarıyar, Amasya
Sazköy, Amasya
Selimiye, Amasya
Sevincer, Amasya
Sıracevizler, Amasya
Tatar, Amasya
Toklucak, Amasya
Tuzluçal, Amasya
Tuzsuz, Amasya
Uygur, Amasya
Vermiş, Amasya
Yavru, Amasya
Yaylacık, Amasya
Yağcıabdal, Amasya
Yağmur, Amasya
Yeşildere, Amasya
Yeşiltepe, Amasya
Yeşilöz, Amasya
Yolyanı, Amasya
Yuvacık, Amasya
Yuvaköy, Amasya
Yıkılgan, Amasya
Yıldızköy, Amasya
Ziyaret, Amasya
Çatalçam, Amasya
Çavuşköy, Amasya
Çengelkayı, Amasya
Çivi, Amasya
Çiğdemlik, Amasya
Özfındıklı, Amasya
Ümük, Amasya
İbecik, Amasya
İlgazi, Amasya
İlyas, Amasya
İpekköy, Amasya
Şeyhsadi, Amasya

Göynücek

Abacı, Göynücek
Alan, Göynücek
Ardıçpınar, Göynücek
Asar, Göynücek
Ayvalıpınar, Göynücek
Bektemür, Göynücek
Beşiktepe, Göynücek
Davutevi, Göynücek
Gaffarlı, Göynücek
Gökçeli, Göynücek
Göynücek
Harmancık, Göynücek
Hasanbey, Göynücek
Ilısu, Göynücek
Karayakup, Göynücek
Karaşar, Göynücek
Kavaklı, Göynücek
Kertme, Göynücek
Kervansaray, Göynücek
Konuralan, Göynücek
Koyuncu, Göynücek
Kışlabeyi, Göynücek
Pembeli, Göynücek
Sığırçayı, Göynücek
Tencerli, Göynücek
Terziköy, Göynücek
Yassıkışla, Göynücek
Yeniköy, Göynücek
Çamurlu, Göynücek
Çayan, Göynücek
Çaykışla, Göynücek
Çulpara, Göynücek
İkizyaka, Göynücek
Şarklı, Göynücek
Şeyhler, Göynücek
Şeyhoğlu, Göynücek

Gümüşhacıköy

Akpınar, Gümüşhacıköy
Alören, Gümüşhacıköy
Bacakoğlu, Gümüşhacıköy
Bademli, Gümüşhacıköy
Balıklı, Gümüşhacıköy
Beden, Gümüşhacıköy
Derbentobruğu, Gümüşhacıköy
Doluca, Gümüşhacıköy
Dumanlı, Gümüşhacıköy
Eslemez, Gümüşhacıköy
Güllüce, Gümüşhacıköy
Gümüşhacıköy
Güplüce
Güvemözü, Gümüşhacıköy
Karaali, Gümüşhacıköy
Karacaören, Gümüşhacıköy
Karakaya, Gümüşhacıköy
Kağnıcı, Gümüşhacıköy
Keçiköy, Gümüşhacıköy
Kiziroğlu, Gümüşhacıköy
Koltuk, Gümüşhacıköy
Konuktepe, Gümüşhacıköy
Korkut, Gümüşhacıköy
Kutluca, Gümüşhacıköy
Kuzalan, Gümüşhacıköy
Köseler, Gümüşhacıköy
Kılıçaslan, Gümüşhacıköy
Kırca, Gümüşhacıköy
Kızık, Gümüşhacıköy
Kızılca, Gümüşhacıköy
Ovabaşı, Gümüşhacıköy
Pusacık, Gümüşhacıköy
Sallar, Gümüşhacıköy
Saraycık, Gümüşhacıköy
Sarayözü, Gümüşhacıköy
Sekü, Gümüşhacıköy
Yazıyeri, Gümüşhacıköy
Çalköy, Gümüşhacıköy
Çavuşköy, Gümüşhacıköy
Çetmi, Gümüşhacıköy
Çiftçioğlu, Gümüşhacıköy
Çitli, Gümüşhacıköy
İmirler, Gümüşhacıköy

Hamamözü

Alanköy, Hamamözü
Arpadere, Hamamözü
Aşağıovacık, Hamamözü
Damladere, Hamamözü
Dedeköy, Hamamözü
Gölköy, Hamamözü
Göçeri, Hamamözü
Hamamözü
Hıdırlar, Hamamözü
Kızılcaören, Hamamözü
Mağaraobruğu, Hamamözü
Omarca, Hamamözü
Sarayözü, Hamamözü
Tekçam, Hamamözü
Tepeköy, Hamamözü
Yemişen, Hamamözü
Yeniköy, Hamamözü
Yukarıovacık, Hamamözü
Çayköy, Hamamözü

Merzifon

Akpınar, Merzifon
Aksungur, Merzifon
Aktarla, Merzifon
Akören, Merzifon
Alişar, Merzifon
Alıcık, Merzifon
Aşağıbük, Merzifon
Bahçecik, Merzifon
Balgöze, Merzifon
Bayat, Merzifon
Bayazıt, Merzifon
Bulak, Merzifon
Büyükçay, Merzifon
Demirpınar, Merzifon
Derealan, Merzifon
Diphacı, Merzifon
Elmayolu, Merzifon
Esentepe, Merzifon
Eymir, Merzifon
Gelinsini, Merzifon
Gökçebağ, Merzifon
Gümüştepe, Merzifon
Hacet, Merzifon
Hacıyakup, Merzifon
Hanköy, Merzifon
Hayrettinköy, Merzifon
Hırka, Merzifon
Kamışlı, Merzifon
Karacakaya, Merzifon
Karamağara, Merzifon
Karamustafapaşa, Merzifon
Karatepe, Merzifon
Karşıyaka, Merzifon
Kayadüzü, Merzifon
Koçköy, Merzifon
Kuyuköy, Merzifon
Küçükçay, Merzifon
Kıreymir, Merzifon
Kızıleğrek, Merzifon
Mahmutlu, Merzifon
Merzifon
Ortabük, Merzifon
Ortaova, Merzifon
Osmanoğlu, Merzifon
Oymaağaç, Merzifon
Oymak, Merzifon
Pekmezci, Merzifon
Saraycık, Merzifon
Sarıbuğday, Merzifon
Sarıköy, Merzifon
Sazlıca, Merzifon
Türkoğlu, Merzifon
Uzunyazı, Merzifon
Yakacık, Merzifon
Yakupköy, Merzifon
Yalnız, Merzifon
Yenice, Merzifon
Yeşilören, Merzifon
Yolüstü, Merzifon
Yukarıbük, Merzifon
Çamlıca, Merzifon
Çavundur, Merzifon
Çaybaşı, Merzifon
Çayırköy, Merzifon
Çayırözü, Merzifon
Çobanören, Merzifon
İnalanı, Merzifon
Şeyhyeni, Merzifon

Suluova

Alabedir, Suluova
Armutlu, Suluova
Arucak, Suluova
Ayrancı, Suluova
Aşağıkarasu, Suluova
Bayırlı, Suluova
Boyalı, Suluova
Cürlü, Suluova
Derebaşalan, Suluova
Dereköy, Suluova
Deveci, Suluova
Eğribük, Suluova
Harmanağılı, Suluova
Kanatpınar, Suluova
Kapancı, Suluova
Karaağaç, Suluova
Kazanlı, Suluova
Kerimoğlu, Suluova
Kolay, Suluova
Kulu, Suluova
Kurnaz, Suluova
Kutlu, Suluova
Kuzalan, Suluova
Küpeli, Suluova
Kılıçaslan, Suluova
Kıranbaşalan, Suluova
Ortayazı, Suluova
Oğulbağı, Suluova
Salucu, Suluova
Saygılı, Suluova
Seyfe, Suluova
Soku, Suluova
Suluova
Uzunoba, Suluova
Yolpınar, Suluova
Yüzbeyi, Suluova
Çayüstü, Suluova
Çukurören, Suluova
Özalakadı, Suluova

Taşova

Alpaslan
Altınlı, Taşova
Alçakbel, Taşova
Ardıçönü, Taşova
Arpaderesi, Taşova
Boraboy, Taşova
Dereköy, Taşova
Devre, Taşova
Durucasu, Taşova
Dutluk, Taşova
Dörtyol, Taşova
Elmakırı, Taşova
Gemibükü, Taşova
Geydoğan, Taşova
Gökpınar, Taşova
Güendik, Taşova
Güngörmüş, Taşova
Gürsu, Taşova
Hacıbeyköyü, Taşova
Hüsnüoğlu, Taşova
Ilıcaköy, Taşova
Ilıpınar, Taşova
Karabük, Taşova
Karlık, Taşova
Karsavul, Taşova
Kavaloluğu, Taşova
Korubaşı, Taşova
Kozluca, Taşova
Kumluca, Taşova
Kırkharman, Taşova
Kızgüldüren, Taşova
Mercimekköy, Taşova
Mülkbükü, Taşova
Sepetli, Taşova
Sofualan, Ayvacık
Tatlıpınar, Taşova
Taşova
Tekpınar, Taşova
Türkmendamı, Taşova
Uluköy, Taşova
Umutlu, Taşova
Yayladibi, Taşova
Yaylasaray, Taşova
Yenidere, Taşova
Yeşiltepe, Taşova
Yeşilyurt, Taşova
Yolaçan, Taşova
Çakırsu, Taşova
Çalkaya, Taşova
Çambükü, Taşova
Çılkıdır, Taşova
Özbaraklı, Taşova
Şahinler, Taşova
Şeyhli, Taşova

External links
Turkstat

Amasya
List